The Journal of the Brazilian Chemical Society (print , eISSN , CODEN JOCSET) is a Brazilian scientific journal in chemistry. It was founded in 1990 and is published by the Brazilian Society of Chemistry (Sociedade Brasileira de Química), located at the Instituto de Química da Universidade de São Paulo. The journal is online, and the full text is freely available. According to the Journal Citation Reports, the journal has a 2014 impact factor of 1.129, ranking it 100th out of 157 journals in the category "Chemistry Multidisciplinary".

The  publishes other chemistry journals with the titles Química Nova and Química Nova na Escola (QNEsc).

The Journal of the Brazilian Chemical Society should not be confounded with publications from the Associação Brasileira de Química (ABQ) in Rio de Janeiro. The latter publishes the Anais da ABQ.

See also 
 Anais da ABQ
 Brazilian Journal of Chemical Engineering
 Química Nova
 Revista Brasileira de Chímica
 Revista Brasileira de Engenharia Química, Caderno de Engenharia Química

References

External links 

 Homepage of the journal: J Braz Chem Soc
 Homepage of the Sociedade Brasileira de Química (SQB): SQB
 Homepage of the Associação Brasileira de Química (ABQ): ABQ

Chemistry journals
Academic journals published by learned and professional societies of Brazil